Estarkhi (also Romanized as Esţarkhī, Esţakhrī, and Estalkhī) is a village in Golian Rural District, in the Central District of Shirvan County, North Khorasan Province, Iran. At the 2006 census, its population was 1,098, in 266 families.

References 

Populated places in Shirvan County